Booby Island may refer to

Booby Island (Western Australia)
Booby Island (Queensland)
Booby Island Light (on Booby Island, Queensland)
Booby Island (Saint Kitts and Nevis), an island off the coast of Saint Kitts and Nevis

See also
Booby Cay, one of the Swan Islands, Honduras